Cymatellopsis is a genus of fungus in the mushroom family Marasmiaceae. This is a monotypic genus, containing the single species Cymatellopsis ilmiana, found in east Africa.

See also
 List of Marasmiaceae genera

References

 

Fungi of Africa
Marasmiaceae
Monotypic Agaricales genera